Moon Maiden is a DC Comics superhero who first appeared in JLA Giant Size Special #3 (October 2000). Dan Curtis Johnson and Dale Eaglesham created her. This has been her only appearance to date. It was a retcon story, written as if she had been a superhero and member of the Justice League for years.

Fictional character biography
Hugh Klein was an American Astronaut on Apollo XXV, the last crewed Moon mission. While on the Moon, Hugh discovered an ancient structure, thereafter referred to as the 'Lunar Villa'. Inside, Hugh finds an infant girl in a cradle, and is then confronted by a ghostly consortium identified as The Hundred. Caelius, speaker for the Hundred, explained how they were a group of scholars and philosophers devoted to peace who fled the Roman Empire. Using alchemical processes, they created the Lunar Villa and attempted to create a champion of their peaceful ideas on Earth, but accidentally created the villain known as Valkus, the Centurion instead. To atone for this mistake, and to perpetuate their beliefs, they created a child they called the Praemonstra Supra, meaning "She Who Will Point the Way'. Hugh returned to Earth with the infant child, and he and his new wife, Jenny, were allowed to adopt and raise the infant, whom they named Laura. Although Laura exhibited no outward super powers, she was always a brilliant and athletic child. When Laura turned 16, her powers of gravity control manifested. Hugh and Jenny explained Laura's origins to her, and she and Hugh travelled to the Lunar Villa, where the ghostly remains of the Hundred explained her origin and their purpose to them. At this point Laura embarked on her career as Laurel, the Moon Maiden. She soon made many friends among the superhero community, was an early member of the Justice League, and shared at least one adventure with the Teen Titans. Throughout this time, her most frequent opponent was the Centurion.

During one of the Centurion's most grandiose schemes, he used a device called an Erasure Weapon, which was capable of erasing a being from history. After this scheme erased several notable heroes from existence, Moon Maiden, along with the remaining members of the Justice League, the Teen Titans, and Infinity Inc. took the battle to the Centurion, in what was known as 'The Century War'. In an act of self-sacrifice, Moon Maiden, took herself and the Centurion high into the sky. She there destroyed his weapon, causing a great explosion, and removing both of them from history. Only Hugh Klein was able to recall his daughter and the events that had occurred.

Moon Maiden eventually returned, wrapped up in the schemes of the Centurion, who had also returned. Hugh was able to rekindle the memories of Laura's friends in the Justice League, and together they were able to free her from the Centurion and she was able to bring a close to his scheme. Afterwards, she felt somewhat lost, as most of the world still was unaware of her, but she had Hugh and her friends to help her rediscover this Earth which was now new to her.

Moon Maiden's only other appearances to date have been an appearance on the cover of JLA/Avengers #3 and a cameo (from the waist down) in the next issue, #4.

Powers and abilities
Moon Maiden is able to manipulate the alchemical processes of the Hundred's Lunar Villa, and as such is able to manipulate the Moon's gravitational pull. The effects range from moving small items around, to flight, to creating havoc with the Earth's tides and earthquakes. She can also induce an effect called 'Lunar Madness' in others, which can manifest as anything from traumatic flashbacks to being driven permanently insane.

See also
 Moondancers

References

Characters created by Dale Eaglesham
DC Comics female superheroes
DC Comics extraterrestrial superheroes
Fictional characters with gravity abilities
Fictional astronauts
Comics characters introduced in 2000
Superheroes who are adopted
Comics set on the Moon
Fictional characters from the Solar System